Luka Babić (born ) is a Montenegrin male volleyball player. An all-rounder, playing as middle blocker and outside hitter, he played with OK Budućnost Podgorica until 2015, after which he spent a season with Budvanska Rivijera Budva, the national champions. He signed for Swiss team Chênois Genève for the 2016/17 season.

Babić played with the Montenegro men's national volleyball team in 2015 and 2016 editions of the FIVB Volleyball World League.

References

External links
 Profile at FIVB.org

1994 births
Living people
Montenegrin men's volleyball players
Place of birth missing (living people)